This page details the process of qualifying for the 1968 African Cup of Nations.

Qualified teams

Group stage

Group 1

Playoff

Group 2

Group 3

Group 4

First round

Second round

United Arab Republic withdrew due to the Six-Day War with Israel, which began on 5 June 1967. Uganda qualified.

Group 5

Group 6

First round

Playoff

Second round

References

External links
 African Nations Cup 1968 - rsssf.com
 AFCON 1968 Qualifiers - athlet.org

Africa Cup of Nations qualification
Qualification
Qual